Sir Nicholas Andrew Serota,  (born 27 April 1946), is an English art historian and curator, who served as the Director of the Tate from 1988 to 2017. He is currently Chair of Arts Council England, a role which he has held since February 2017.

Serota was previously Director of The Museum of Modern Art, Oxford, and Director of the Whitechapel Gallery, London, before becoming Director of the Tate in 1988. He was also Chairman of the Turner Prize jury until 2007.

Early life

Nicholas Serota was born and raised in Hampstead, North London, the only son of Stanley Serota  and Beatrice Katz Serota. His father was a civil engineer and his mother a civil servant, later a life peer and Labour Minister for Health in Harold Wilson's government and local government ombudsman. He has a younger sister, Judith. Serota was educated at Haberdashers' Aske's School (where he was appointed School Captain) and then read Economics at Christ's College, Cambridge (University of Cambridge), before switching to History of Art. He completed a master's degree at The Courtauld Institute of Art, University of London, under the supervision of Michael Kitson and Anita Brookner; his thesis was on the work of J. M. W. Turner.

In 1969, Serota became Chairman of the new Young Friends of the Tate organisation with a membership of 750. They took over a building in Pear Place, south of Waterloo Bridge, arranging lectures and Saturday painting classes for local children. The Young Friends staged their own shows and applied for an Arts Council grant, but were asked to desist by the Tate Chairman and Trustees, who were concerned with the appearance of official backing for these ventures. Serota and his committee resigned, which caused the end of the Young Friends, whose accommodation was taken over for rehearsals by the National Theatre.

In 1970, he joined the Arts Council of Great Britain's Visual Arts Department as a regional exhibitions officer. In 1973 he was made Director of the Museum of Modern Art, Oxford (now Modern Art Oxford), where he organised an early exhibition of work by Joseph Beuys and formed a working relationship with Alexander "Sandy" Nairne, who worked with Serota at various points in the following years.

Whitechapel directorship

In 1976, Serota was appointed Director of the Whitechapel Gallery in London's East End. The Whitechapel was well regarded but had suffered from lack of resources. Serota assembled at the Whitechapel a staff including Jenni Lomax (later Director of the Camden Arts Centre), Mark Francis (later of Gagosian Gallery) and Sheena Wagstaff (later Chief Curator of Tate Modern), and organised exhibitions of Carl Andre, Eva Hesse and Gerhard Richter as well as early exhibitions of then emerging artists such as Antony Gormley.

In 1976 he was a judge for an art competition run by the brewers Trumans. In 1980, assisted by Alexander "Sandy" Nairne, he organised a two-part exhibition of 20th century British sculpture. In 1981, he curated The New Spirit in Painting, with Norman Rosenthal and Christos Joachimides for the Royal Academy.

The shows, where Serota was helped by his administrator Loveday Shewell, often received adverse reviews in the press, which reacted with an uncharacteristic dislike for contemporary avant-garde art. Thus Serota remained somewhat distanced from the English establishment, although developing a growing reputation internationally in the art world.

In 1984–1985, Serota shut down the Whitechapel for over 12 months for extensive refurbishment. A strip of land had been acquired, which allowed a design by architects Colquhoun and Miller for a first-floor gallery, restaurant, lecture theatre and other rooms. Although receiving wide approbation, the scheme was in deficit by £250,000. In 1987, Serota raised £1.4m in an auction of work, which he had asked artists to donate, paying off the debt, and creating an endowment fund to allow future exhibitions of more unconventional work, unlikely to attract a commercial sponsor.

Tate directorship

The short-listed candidates for the Tate Directorship, who included Norman Rosenthal and Julian Spalding, were asked to prepare a seven-year scheme for the Tate. Serota's submission, on two sides of A4 paper, was titled "Grasping the Nettle". It analysed the various areas of Tate work and proposed future stratagems to deal with the imminent crisis caused by restricted government financial support, changing public sector management expectations and increasing art market prices. He saw many areas of the Tate's operations in need of overhaul, and concluded that the gallery was loved, but not respected enough. Tate Chairman, Richard Rogers considered this by far the best proposal submitted.

News of Serota's appointment as Tate Director in 1988 was received enthusiastially by Howard Hodgkin, who wrote in The Sunday Times, "Nick Serota has enormous energy and demonstrated at the Whitechapel a tremendous sense of diplomacy. He is a passionate man, and indeed is quite unusual in this country in his commitment to modern painting and sculpture."

In contrast, Peter Fuller made a scathing attack in Modern Painters magazine, saying that Serota would be incapable, by temperament and ability, of maintaining the Tate's historic collection.

Major expansion of the Tate Gallery had been seen as inevitable for two decades. In 1993, the creation of the National Lottery made it possible to anticipate the availability of major public funding for an enlarged Gallery.

In 1995, Tate received £52 million towards the conversion of the former Bankside Power Station to create Tate Modern. The final cost was £135 million; Serota managed to secure the funds to make up the shortfall from a range of private sources. Tate Modern opened in May 2000 and quickly became a major tourist fixture of London. As well as housing acclaimed new works by Louise Bourgeois and Anish Kapoor, the Gallery has also provided the base for successful exhibitions of Donald Judd, Picasso, Matisse and Edward Hopper.

On 21 November 2000, Serota gave the Dimbleby Lecture in London. He started it by telling of a 1987 Civil Service enquiry which ranked the pay of the Tate Gallery director with that of larger museums such as the National Gallery, because the former "has to deal with the very difficult problem of modern art."  He explained it thus:

As of 2015, Serota was paid a salary of between £165,000 and £169,999 by the Tate, making him one of the 328 most highly paid people in the British public sector at that time, at the lower end of the senior officials 'high earners' list, and well below what similar executives earn in public health, transport or government administrative top roles.

In 1998, Serota conceived "Operation Cobalt", the secret buy-back of two of the Tate's paintings by J. M. W. Turner that had been stolen in 1994 while they were on loan to a gallery in Frankfurt. The paintings were recovered in 2000 and 2002.

In December 2005, Serota admitted that he had submitted an application form with false information to the Art Fund (NACF) for a £75,000 grant to go towards buying the painting The Upper Room, stating that the Tate had made no commitment to purchase the work (a requirement of the grant), whereas they had already paid a first instalment of £250,000 several months previously. He attributed this to "a failing in his head". The NACF allowed the Tate to keep the grant. In 2006, the Charity Commission ruled the Tate had broken charity law (but not the criminal law) over the purchase and similar trustee purchases, including ones made before Serota's directorship. The Daily Telegraph called the verdict "one of the most serious indictments of the running of one of the nation's major cultural institutions in living memory". In April 2008, Thomson started a petition on the Prime Minister's website against Serota's Tate directorship.

In September 2016, the Tate announced that Serota would step down as director in 2017, and he would become director of Arts Council England, for the term 1 February 2017 to 31 January 2025. Serota was succeeded at the Tate by Maria Balshaw.

Reactions
Serota has been criticised by Platform and Liberate Tate for inviting increased sponsorship of the Tate from BP. Their demands were supported by 8,000 Tate members and visitors, and artists including Conrad Atkinson. When questioned about BP sponsorship during the Deepwater Horizon oil spill, Serota responded "We all recognise they have a difficulty at the moment but you don't abandon your friends because they have what we consider to be a temporary difficulty."

The art critic Brian Sewell coined the critical phrase 'the Serota tendency' to refer to the popular BritArt movement of the 1990s that was favoured by Serota's Tate and collectors such as Charles Saatchi.

Since its formation in 1999, the Stuckist art group has campaigned against Serota, who is the subject of the group's co-founder Charles Thomson's satirical painting Sir Nicholas Serota Makes an Acquisitions Decision (2000), one of the best known  Stuckist works and a likely "signature piece" for the movement. Serota was dubbed the "least likely visitor" to The Stuckists Punk Victorian show at the Walker Art Gallery in 2004, which included a wall of work satirising him and the Tate, including Thomson's painting. In fact, he did visit and met the artists, describing the work as "lively". In 2005, the Stuckists offered 160 paintings from the Walker show as a donation to the Tate. Serota wrote to the Stuckists, saying that the work was not of "sufficient quality in terms of accomplishment, innovation or originality of thought to warrant preservation in perpetuity in the national collection", and was accused of "snubbing one of Britain’s foremost collections".

In 2001, Stuart Pearson Wright, winner of that year's BP Portrait Award, said that Serota should be sacked, because of his advocacy of conceptual art and neglect of figurative painting.

Honours
Serota was knighted in the 1999 New Year Honours and appointed Member of the Order of the Companions of Honour (CH) in the 2013 Birthday Honours for services to art.

Personal life
In 1973, Serota married Angela Beveridge, and they had two daughters, Anya and Beth.  In 1997, he married Teresa Gleadowe, a curator and arts administrator, with whom he has two stepdaughters. As of 2012, they were living in Kings Cross, London, and have a second home in Cornwall.

References

External links

1946 births
Living people
British art curators
English curators
British Jews
Directors of the Tate galleries
Alumni of Christ's College, Cambridge
Alumni of the Courtauld Institute of Art
Members of the Order of the Companions of Honour
Knights Bachelor
People educated at Haberdashers' Boys' School
BBC Board members
Sons of life peers